The following is a timeline of the history of the city of Toledo, Spain.

Prior to 20th century

 193 CE - Settlement becomes part of the Roman Empire.
 250-300 - Roman Catholic diocese of Toledo established. Population: 15,000
 397-400 - Religious Council of Toledo held.
 589 - Religious Council of Toledo held. Population: 10,000
 712 - Muslims in power; city renamed "Tolaitola."
 999 - Bib Mardum Mosque built.
 1085 - Christian Alfonso VI of León and Castile takes Toledo.
 1088 - Toledo archbishop becomes Primate of Spain.
 1102 - Puerta del Cambrón (gate) built.
 1180 - Santa María la Blanca synagogue built.
 1209 - Rodrigo Jiménez de Rada becomes archbishop.
 1227 - Toledo Cathedral construction begins.
 1366 - Synagogue of El Transito built.
 1380 - Public clock installed (approximate date).
 1390 - Puente de San Martín (bridge) rebuilt.
 1484 - Printing press in use.
 1493 - Toledo Cathedral construction completed.
 1520 -  established.
 1561 - Court of Philip II of Spain relocated from Toledo to Madrid. Population: 60,000
 1576 - Artist El Greco moves to Toledo.
 1703 -  (town hall) built.
 1808 - Battalion of University Volunteers from the Royal University of Toledo formed.
 1842 - Population: 13,580.
 1857 - Population: 17,275.
 1878 - Teatro Rojas (theatre) opens.
 1887 - Alcázar of Toledo burns down.
 1900 - Population: 23,317.

20th century

 1919 - Toledo railway station built.
 1928 - CD Toledo (football club) formed.
 1930 - Population: 27,443.
 1931 -  (provincial archives) established.
 1936 - Siege of the Alcázar.
 1940 - Historic city area designated a Conjunto histórico (national heritage site).
 1950 - Population: 40,243.
 1973 - Estadio Salto del Caballo (stadium) opens.
 1979 -  becomes mayor.
 1981 - Population: 57,769.
 1986 - Historic city area designated an UNESCO World Heritage Site.
 1987 - El Día de Toledo newspaper begins publication.
 1998 - Biblioteca de Castilla-La Mancha (library) opens.

21st century

 2001 - Population: 68,382.
 2009 - Gente Toledo newspaper begins publication.
 2011 - Population:83,872.
 2015
 24 May:  and Castile-La Mancha parliamentary election, 2015 held.
  becomes mayor.

See also
 Toledo, Spain history
 History of Toledo, Spain
 List of bishops and archbishops of Toledo
 List of mayors since 1979

References

This article incorporates information from the Spanish Wikipedia.

Bibliography

in English
 
 
 
 
 ***Please note that a wikilink to the article on [Toledo, Spain] in [EB1911] is not available***

in Spanish

External links

 Items related to Toledo, various dates (via Europeana)
 Items related to Toledo, various dates (via Digital Public Library of America)

toledo
Toledo, Spain